Gifted is the debut novel by author Nikita Lalwani longlisted for the Man Booker Prize and shortlisted for the Costa First Novel Award. It was first published in 2007 by Viking.

Plot introduction
The novel is set in the 1980s Cardiff where maths prodigy Rumi Vasi grows up with her Hindu parents. Subjected to her father's strict tutoring he is determined that she be accepted by Oxford University at the age of only fifteen.  But on starting University she finds it hard to adapt to her new-found freedom.

References

External links
first 3 chapters
review from The Guardian
review from The Independent
review from The New York Times

2007 British novels
Welsh novels
Novels set in Cardiff
Novels set in the 1980s
Anglo-Welsh novels
2007 debut novels
Viking Press books